John D'Ewes Evelyn Firth (21 February 1900 – 21 September 1957) was a schoolboy cricketer at Winchester College during the First World War. He went on to become a Church of England clergyman.

Early life
He was born in Nottingham, the son of John Benjamin Firth and his wife Helena Gertrude.

Cricketer
A leg-break and googly bowler, Firth took all 10 wickets for 41 runs in a match against Eton College in 1917 and was named as a Wisden Cricketer of the Year among a selection of five public school bowlers in the 1918 almanack, there being no first-class cricket to report on.  In a first-class career of just four matches, Firth played twice for Oxford University and twice for Nottinghamshire.

Career
Firth became a schoolmaster and chaplain at Winchester College and wrote several books about the school, where his nickname was "Budge" Firth. He later became Master of the Temple and was canon emeritus of Winchester Cathedral at the time of his death, which occurred in Winchester.

Firth wrote the biography of Dr Montague Rendall (1862-1950), former Headmaster of Winchester College.

References

People educated at Winchester College
Wisden Cricketers of the Year
Oxford University cricketers
Nottinghamshire cricketers
Cricketers from Nottingham
English cricketers
1900 births
1957 deaths
Alumni of Christ Church, Oxford
Schoolteachers from Hampshire
20th-century English Anglican priests
Masters of the Temple